The beliefs and practices of Scientology include material related to sex and the rearing of children, which collectively form the Second Dynamic (urge toward survival) in Scientology. These beliefs and practices are based on the written works of Church of Scientology founder L. Ron Hubbard.

The Second Dynamic
In Hubbard's original Dynamics, "Sex" was the Second Dynamic, representing both the sexual act and the family unit. According to Reuters: "The second dynamic includes all creative activity, including sex, procreating and the raising of children."

Pain and Sex

On August 26, 1982 Hubbard authored a Hubbard Communications Office Bulletin (HCOB) entitled "Pain and Sex", in which he accuses psychiatrists (abbreviated "psychs"), of orchestrating a global conspiracy to undermine society and spread chaos:
Combined, pain and sex make up the insane Jack-the-Rippers (who killed only prostitutes) and the whole strange body of sex-murder freaks, including Hinckley, and the devotees of late-night horror movies. Under the false data of the psychs (who have been on the track a long time and are the sole cause of decline in this universe) both pain and sex are gaining ground in this society and, coupled with robbery which is a hooded companion of both, may very soon make the land a true jungle of crime.
In the same bulletin, Hubbard claims that pain and sex are both "invented tools of degradation" by "destructive creatures" (referring to psychiatrists) with the intention "to shrink people and cut their alertness, knowingness, power and reach".

Homosexuality

In 1950 Hubbard published Dianetics: The Modern Science of Mental Health, wherein he classified homosexuality as an illness or sexual perversion.  According to Jeffrey S. Siker in Homosexuality and Religion, this was within the mainstream of opinion at the time.

Hubbard's emotional tone scale, classifying individuals and human behaviour on a chart running from +40 (the most beneficial) to -40 (the least beneficial), gave sexual perversions a score of 1.1, "the level of the pervert, the hypocrite, the turncoat, ... the subversive". Such people, he argued, were "skulking coward[s] who yet contain enough perfidious energy to strike back, but not enough courage ever to give warning".

Sex during pregnancy

Hubbard warned against sexual activity (including masturbation) during pregnancy, on the premise that sexual activity during pregnancy could damage fetal development, by producing engrams detrimental to future activity. This view is disputed by doctors, as Paulette Cooper commented in her book The Scandal of Scientology:

These same beliefs form the basis for Hubbard's "Silent birth" doctrine, which dictates that no words are spoken during the childbirth process. According to a Scientology manual on raising children,  a couple should be silent before and after coition.

Promiscuity
In the 1967 book The Dynamics of Life (originally written circa 1948), Hubbard states that "promiscuity inevitably and invariably indicates a sexual engram of great magnitude. Once that engram is removed, promiscuity can be expected to cease". A footnote then defines promiscuity as "having sexual relations with many people". Hubbard writes in his book The Way to Happiness that if sex is "misused or abused, carries with it heavy penalties and punishments: nature seems to have intended it that way also".

In later years, Hubbard sought to distance himself from efforts to regulate the sexual affairs of Scientologists. In a 1967 policy letter, he declared: "It has never been any part of my plans to regulate or to attempt to regulate the private lives of individuals. Whenever this has occurred, it has not resulted in any improved condition... Therefore all former rules, regulations and policies relating to the sexual activities of Scientologists are cancelled."

Scientology auditing
In an interview with Playboy magazine, Hubbard's estranged son Ronald DeWolf asserted that auditing focused on sex and the individual's sex life, and could later be used as a form of control: "Auditing would address a guy's entire sex life. It was an incredible preoccupation. ... You have complete control over someone if you have every detail of his sex life and fantasy life on record. In Scientology the focus is on sex. Sex, sex, sex. The first thing we wanted to know about someone we were auditing was his sexual deviations. All you've got to do is find a person's kinks, whatever they might be. Their dreams and fantasies. Then you can fit a ring through their noses and take them anywhere. You promise to fulfill their fantasies or you threaten to expose them ... very simple."

Scientology's views on the body
Hubbard called the physical world MEST (an acronym of "Matter, Energy, Space and Time"), which thetans (souls) temporarily operating "meat bodies" are meant to transcend and conquer. New recruits to the church are often classified as "raw meat" or "raw public". Scientologists refer to their bodies as "meat bodies".

Scientology emphasizes attaining "cause over MEST", and attaining the ability to abandon one's body via "exteriorization" and ultimately by becoming an Operating Thetan Clear and a Cleared Theta Clear.

See also
 Religion and sexuality
 Scientology and sexual orientation

Further reading

References

Scientology beliefs and practices